The Dixie Hunt Hotel is a historic hotel building in Gainesville, Georgia. It was built in 1937 by Brenau University on the site of a former building donated to them by an alumna, the widow of businessman Jim Hunt. The university sold the building in 1969. It was designed in the Art Deco style by architect William J.J. Chase. The style is rare in Georgia; this is one of relatively few Art Deco buildings in the state. It has been listed on the National Register of Historic Places since May 16, 1985.

References

	
National Register of Historic Places in Hall County, Georgia
Art Deco architecture in Georgia (U.S. state)
Hotel buildings completed in 1937
Brenau University